is a train station on the Sagano Line in Ukyo-ku, Kyoto, Japan, operated by West Japan Railway Company (JR West).

Lines
Uzumasa Station is served by the Sagano Line, which is part of the Sanin Main Line.

Layout
The station has two side platforms.

Platforms

History
Uzumasa Station opened on 11 March 1989.

Station numbering was introduced in March 2018 with Uzumasa being assigned station number JR-E07.

Surrounding area
Katabiranotsuji Station (Randen)
Toei Kyoto Studio Park

See also
 List of railway stations in Japan

References

Railway stations in Japan opened in 1989
Railway stations in Kyoto Prefecture
Sanin Main Line